Villaines is an unmanned halt in Villaines-sous-Bois (Val d'Oise department), France.  It is on the Luzarches line. The station is served by the Transilien H trains from Paris to Luzarches. In 2002 the stop was used by fewer than 500 passengers per day.

Bus routes
CIF: 47
Carianne: 002

References

External links
 

Railway stations in Val-d'Oise
Railway stations in France opened in 1880